This is a list of people who remarried each other, usually after divorcing. To qualify, at least one member of each marital pair must have their own Wikipedia page.

Noteworthy cases
 Cato the Younger and Marcia who divorced so that Marcia could marry another man named Quintus Hortensius and have children by him, but speedily remarried as soon as Hortensius died.
 Kid McCoy, American prize fighter, who married and divorced ten times, but only from eight women, since three of those marriages were to the same spouse, Julia Woodruff
 Richard Pryor, American comedian and actor, who was twice married and divorced from Flynn Belaine, and twice married to Jennifer Lee
 Joyce Mathews, American actress, who was twice divorced from both Milton Berle and Billy Rose

List

See also
 Sororate marriage
 Levirate marriage

References

Remarried the same spouse
Remarriage
Reunions